Castle Comfort is a community in Saint George Parish, Dominica. 789 inhabitants live there and in neighbouring Wall House.

References

Populated places in Dominica